The Breeze Card is a stored value smart card that passengers use as part of an automated fare collection system which the Metropolitan Atlanta Rapid Transit Authority (MARTA) introduced to the general public in early October 2006. The card automatically debits the cost of the passenger’s ride when placed on or near the Breeze Target at the fare gate. Transit riders are able to add value or time-based passes to the card at Breeze Vending Machines (BVM) located at all MARTA stations. The major phases of MARTA's Breeze transformation took place before July 1, 2007 when customers were still able to purchase TransCards from ridestores or their employers. They were also able to obtain paper transfers from bus drivers to access the train. As of July 1, 2007 the TransCard and the paper transfers were discontinued and patrons now use a Breeze Card or ticket to access the system (except for single bus rides, which can still be paid for in exact change), and all transfers are loaded on the card. Breeze Vending Machines (BVM) distribute regional transit provider passes (providing that the requested system has completed their transformation to the Universal Breeze AFC.) The Breeze Card employs passive RFID technology currently in use in many transit systems around the world.

Overview
The Breeze system uses a Breeze card. The card, made of plastic, is durable and can be purchased for $2. The card can be reloaded on a bus (cash only) or at a Breeze vending machine (BVM). There is also a ticket composed of coated paper around the RFID antenna, which are only available for groups, school students, and during special events.

The fares are authenticated by RFID at the rail station fare gates or at the fare boxes in the buses. The cards are also used to receive transfers when riders tap to exit the rail station. Transfers are automatically loaded when riders tap their Breeze cards as they enter a bus.

Services 
Breeze Card can be used with MARTA Bus and Rapid Rail, CobbLinc service of Cobb County, Ride Gwinnett of Gwinnett county as well as GRTA Express bus services.

History of Breeze conversion
In preparation for the Breeze Card, MARTA initially deployed the Breeze Ticket, a limited-use paper stored value card. During the installation phase (December 2005 to September 2006) Breeze gates were installed in all stations, there were new bus fare boxes and Breeze Vending Machines "BVMs", in which individuals can buy Tickets encoded with one ride. MARTA first implemented Breeze at the Bankhead station in December 2005. System wide installation (both train stations and buses) was completed in early September, making MARTA the first system in the United States to move towards only smart cards for fare (excepting cash).

Between October 6, 2006 and July 2007, patrons were allowed to purchase Breeze Cards (which initially expired three years after first use) for free. Also, starting October 2006, patrons were allowed to reload Breeze Tickets (which expire 90 days after purchase). After July 2007, the price to purchase a Breeze card and a Breeze ticket were set to $5 and $0.50 respectively. Now, the BVMs provide patrons with the ability to check a card's balance, and pay for parking at certain stations. The BVMs currently accept credit cards and cash for payment.

The system stopped selling tokens in the late fall, and magnetic weekly and monthly MARTA cards were still sold until July 2007 when magnetic cards were invalidated permanently; signalling completion of the Breeze system conversion. Breeze cards became available by mail to customers that pre-ordered starting September 30, 2007. As the conversion reached its final phase, MARTA hosted "token exchanges"(October–December), allowing for people with rolls of tokens to have the number of tokens encoded on an extended-use card.

In May 2007 MARTA began to charge a 50 cent surcharge on all Breeze Tickets. In July 2007 MARTA also stopped offering free Breeze Cards online and order forms from MARTA Ride Stores. Magnetic cards were invalidated permanently and MARTA considered the Breeze system complete.

In July 2007 MARTA indicated that pay per boarding was scheduled to begin. This meant that all customers would have to pay with a Breeze Card, ticket or cash. Transfers were only available on Breeze fare media – no paper transfers or bus to rail magnetic transfers were to be issued. When this happened, to transfer free to MARTA, it was necessary to use a Breeze Card or Breeze Ticket because MARTA was no longer accepting paper transfers or bus to rail transfers.

In July 2017 the original blue Breeze cards were discontinued and replaced with new silver cards that offer "added security to combat fraud and abuse."

Changes to old token-based system
MARTA's Breeze allows riders to load money on the card for use over time, and to add 7- and 30-day passes that are not fixed to a calendar period. The system provides a better way for MARTA to analyze transit patterns, allowing for schedule changes to suit demand, and free up more staff to work directly with customers in stations. Breeze also helps prevent fare evasion, which in previous years cost an estimated US$10 million annually.

The upgrade to Breeze also resulted in a complete replacement of all fare gates and token-based system. The previous system was subject to entrance without payment, as a low turnstile permitted "turnstile jumping" and a handicapped gate could easily be opened by reaching over to push the exit bar. Moreover, there were instances where the turnstile mechanisms would be deteriorated such that some people could forcefully advance the turnstiles with their bodies. The new system offers taller gates and cannot be opened from the outside without first paying.

Potential
The new system allows MARTA to consider using exit fares and distance-based fares. However, MARTA has stated it has no plans to implement any changes to its existing flat one-way fare policy.

Other transit systems have expressed interest in expanding the Breeze infrastructure to take advantage of seamless transfers as provided by reciprocal agreements with MARTA. The first system to adopt Breeze was Cobb Community Transit, which planned to implement Breeze along with MARTA's timeline.

Criticisms
The pilot installation of the system at the Bankhead station created controversy when it was discovered the fare gates ended  from the ground, allowing fare evaders to crawl underneath the gates. Incidents have also been noted in which people trick the sensors to believe that a person is exiting a station while actually entering, but has been alleviated by requiring the use of a card to exit stations.

There have been many problems with BVMs not accepting credit cards and/or debit cards that have lasted for days.

Technology

The Breeze Card uses the MIFARE smart-card system from Dutch company NXP Semiconductors, a spin-off from Philips.  System supports single-use as well as multi-use cards. The disposable, single-use tickets contain MIFARE Ultralight technology. 

The first generation of Breeze cards were MIFARE Classic cards and were blue in color. These cards have been phased out due to known security weaknesses and are no longer valid for transportation. 

The current generation Breeze cards, which are grey in color are called silver cards, are based on MIFARE DESFire EV1 technology.

See also
List of smart cards
MIFARE

References

External links
Breeze Card website
MARTA website

Metropolitan Atlanta Rapid Transit Authority
Fare collection systems in the United States
Contactless smart cards
2006 introductions
2006 establishments in Georgia (U.S. state)